is the 22nd single of the Japanese pop singer and songwriter Miho Komatsu released under Giza studio label. It was released 28 July 2004. The single reached #32 and sold 4,969 copies. It is charted for 2 weeks and sold 5,796 copies.

Track list
All songs are written and composed by Miho Komatsu

arrangement: Hirohito Furui (Garnet Crow)

arrangement: Hitoshi Okamoto (Garnet Crow)
"sha la la..."
arrangement: Hitoshi Okamoto
 (instrumental)

References 

2004 singles
Miho Komatsu songs
Songs written by Miho Komatsu
2004 songs
Giza Studio singles
Being Inc. singles
Song recordings produced by Daiko Nagato